Irrlicht is the first album by Klaus Schulze. Originally released in 1972, in 2006 it was the sixteenth Schulze album reissued by Revisited Records as part of a series of Schulze album reissues. Recorded without a synthesizer, Irrlicht's set of "early organ drone experiments" is "not exactly the music for which KS got famous".

Overview
The album's complete title is: Irrlicht: Quadrophonische Symphonie für Orchester und E-Maschinen (German: "Will-o'-the-wisp: Quadraphonic Symphony for Orchestra and Electronic Machines"). Its atmospheric drone music tone is similar to Tangerine Dream's album Zeit (released the same month) as it stemmed from a common idea that Schulze and Edgar Froese couldn't agree on and parted ways over.

In 2005, Schulze said, "Irrlicht still has more connections to Musique concrète than with today's electronics. I still never owned a synthesiser at the time." Schulze mainly used a broken and modified electric organ, a recording of a classical orchestra rehearsal played backward, and a damaged amplifier to filter and alter sounds that he mixed on tape into a three-movement symphony.

Irrlicht, despite its highly unconventional nature, was originally released on the krautrock label Ohr. Because Schulze was signed to them while a member of Tangerine Dream, the label asserted that his solo album belonged to them too; Schulze's reaction was, "I was just glad that Irrlicht was released at all. Any other company would have probably turned me away with this record."

Track listing
All tracks composed by Klaus Schulze.

Notes
On vinyl, "Ebene" and "Gewitter" were combined into one 29:00 long track.
"Satz" is the German word for the musical term "movement", therefore "1. Satz" is German for "1st Movement". Translated, the titles mean:  
 1st Movement: "Plain" (as in the flat plains of Sils)
 2nd Movement: "Thunderstorm"
 3rd Movement: "Sils Maria exile" (possibly a reference to Nietzsche)
 The 3rd Movement "Exil Sils Maria" was recorded backwards. The recording can be heard the way it was originally recorded by being played in reverse.

Personnel
 Klaus Schulze – "E-machines", organ, guitar, percussion, zither, voice, etc.
 Colloquium Musica Orchestra (4 first violins, 4 second violins, 3 violas, 8 cellos, 1 bass, 2 horns, 2 flutes, 3 oboes) – recorded as raw material then post-processed and filtered on tape.

References
 Irrlicht CD booklet, 2006, Revisited Records, SPV 304962 CD

Notes

External links
 Irrlicht at the official site of Klaus Schulze
 

Klaus Schulze albums
1972 debut albums
Ohr (record label) albums
Musique concrète albums